John Cameron Mitchell (born April 21, 1963) is a two-time Tony Award winning American actor, playwright, screenwriter, singer, songwriter, producer and director. He is best known as the writer, director and star of the 2001 film Hedwig and the Angry Inch, which is based on the musical of the same name that he wrote the book for. He also portrayed the role of Joe Exotic in the Peacock limited series Joe vs. Carole in 2022.

Early years
Mitchell was born in El Paso, Texas and was raised on a variety of military bases in Kansas, New Mexico, Pennsylvania, and Germany. His father, John Henderson Mitchell, was a U.S. Army major general and the U.S. Commander of West Berlin from 1984 to 1988. His mother, Joan Cameron Mitchell, a native of Glasgow, Scotland, immigrated to the United States at a young age to become an art teacher. He had an older brother who died at birth and three younger brothers: Christopher Lloyd, Colin Mackenzie, and Samuel Latham, the last of whom died in 1977 when Mitchell was in eighth grade. He was raised devoutly Roman Catholic and he attended Catholic schools in both Scotland and the U.S., including St. Xavier High School in Junction City, Kansas, and St. Pius X High School in Albuquerque, New Mexico, graduating from the latter in 1981. Mitchell's first stage role was as the Virgin Mary in a Nativity musical staged at a Scottish Benedictine boys' boarding school when Mitchell was 11-years-old. He studied theater at Northwestern University from 1981 to 1985, but did not graduate.

Career
Mitchell's first professional stage role was Huckleberry Finn in a 1985 Organic Theater adaptation at Chicago's Goodman Theatre. His first New York acting role was Huck Finn in the Broadway musical Big River (1985). He originated the role of Dickon on Broadway in The Secret Garden, and appeared in the original cast of the off-Broadway musical Hello Again. He received Drama Desk nominations for both roles, and can be heard on the original cast recordings for each.

He appeared in the original cast of John Guare's Six Degrees of Separation (both off- and on-Broadway), and starred in Larry Kramer's off-Broadway sequel to The Normal Heart, The Destiny of Me, for which he received an Obie Award and a Drama Desk nomination.

Mitchell's early television work includes guest-starring roles in Daybreak, MacGyver, Head of the Class, Law & Order, The New Twilight Zone, Freddy's Nightmares, The Equalizer, Our House, The Dreamer of Oz: The L. Frank Baum Story, and The Stepford Children. He was a regular cast member on the 1996 Fox sitcom Party Girl, and was the long-running voice of Sydney, the animated kangaroo mascot of Dunkaroos snack cookies.

Starring and co-starring film roles include a homicidal new waver in Band of the Hand (1986), a Polish immigrant violinist in Misplaced (1990), and a teen Lothario poet in Book of Love (1990). Mitchell had a single line ("Delivery!") in Spike Lee's Girl Six (1996) as a man auditioning for a pornographic film.
Mitchell is a founding member of the Drama Department Theater Company, for which he adapted and directed Tennessee Williams' Kingdom of Earth starring Cynthia Nixon and Peter Sarsgaard.

Hedwig and the Angry Inch
In 1998, Mitchell wrote (along with composer Stephen Trask) and starred in Hedwig and the Angry Inch, an Obie Award-winning off-Broadway rock musical about a genderqueer East German rock musician chasing after an ex-lover who plagiarized her songs.

Three years later, he directed and starred in the feature-film version of the play, for which he won Best Director at the 2001 Sundance Film Festival. Mitchell’s performance was nominated for a Golden Globe as Best Actor in a Musical or Comedy. Both the play and the film were critical hits and have spawned cult followings around the world.

The 2014 Broadway production of Hedwig starred Neil Patrick Harris and Lena Hall, was directed by Michael Mayer, and won four Tony Awards, including Best Actor in a Musical (Harris), Best Featured Actress in a Musical (Hall), and Best Revival of a Musical. Mitchell reprised his performance in the role of Hedwig on Broadway for a limited run in early 2015, opposite Lena Hall as Yitzhak. He received a 2015 Special Tony Award for his return to the role.

Shortbus
After the success of Hedwig, Mitchell expressed an interest in writing, directing, and producing a film that incorporated explicit sex in a naturalistic and thoughtful way, without using "stars". After three years of talent searches, improvisation workshops, and production, Shortbus premiered in May 2006 at the 2006 Cannes Film Festival. The film garnered many awards, at venues such as the Athens, Gijon, and Zurich International Film Festivals.

Rabbit Hole
He directed the 2010 film Rabbit Hole, starring Nicole Kidman (in an Oscar-nominated performance) and Aaron Eckhart, adapted from David Lindsay-Abaire's Pulitzer Prize-winning play of the same name about a couple dealing with the loss of their four-year-old son. Mitchell became interested in directing the project out of a personal connection to the story, having dealt with the death of his four-year-old brother as a teenager. The film debuted at the Toronto Film Festival.

Other work
Mitchell was the executive producer of the 2004 film Tarnation, a documentary about the life of Jonathan Caouette, whom he met when the latter auditioned for Shortbus.  Tarnation won 2004 Best Documentary from the National Society of Film Critics, the Independent Spirit Awards and the Gotham Awards. He directed videos for Bright Eyes' "First Day of My Life" (featuring Secret Garden co-star Alison Fraser) and the Scissor Sisters' "Filthy/Gorgeous"; the latter was banned from MTV Europe for its explicitly sexual content. In 2012, Mitchell wrote and produced a narrative short film for Sigur Rós titled "Seraph", directed by animator Dash Shaw.

Mitchell has appeared as a pundit on Politically Incorrect and various VH1 and Independent Film Channel programs. He introduced films on a show called Escape From Hollywood on IFC for two years. He wrote and directed a number of short films and commercials for Dior including Lady Grey London and L.A.dy Dior both starring Marion Cotillard and Dior Homme Sport, starring Jude Law. In 2013, He wrote and directed a fashion video for Agent Provocateur entitled "Insurrection".

In 2016, Mitchell appeared on Amanda Palmer and Jherek Bischoff's tribute album to late musician David Bowie, Amanda Palmer and Jherek Bischoff: Strung Out In Heaven (A David Bowie Tribute).He contributed vocals to English and German covers of Bowie's song, Heroes.

Mitchell appeared as a recurring character, e-book editor David Pressler-Goings, on the 2013 and 2014 seasons of HBO series Girls, and as Andy Warhol in the 2016 season of HBO's Vinyl.  Mitchell appeared in the 2016 documentary Danny Says alongside Danny Fields, Alice Cooper and Iggy Pop. He has recurred as a character based on Milo Yiannopoulos on CBS All Access's The Good Fight opposite Christine Baranski and as the character of Egon in Season 4 of Amazon Studios' Mozart in the Jungle opposite Gael García Bernal. In 2014, he directed an unaired pilot of Showtime series Happyish starring Philip Seymour Hoffman in his last role. John's film How to Talk to Girls at Parties, a screen adaptation of Neil Gaiman's punk-era short story of the same title starring Elle Fanning, Alex Sharp, and Nicole Kidman was released by A24 in spring 2018. He directed (with co-director Mark A. Burkley) Netflix's GLOW  Season 2 episode "Mother of All Matches" which was deemed Number One of "The best TV episodes of 2018" by Entertainment Weekly.

Mitchell was a series cast member in Hulu's Shrill, which stars Aidy Bryant and is based on Lindy West's memoir of the same title. He has recently toured The Origin of Love: The Songs and Stories of Hedwig featuring the songs of Stephen Trask and in 2019 released his latest musical, co-written with Bryan Weller, as a fictional podcast series entitled Anthem: Homunculus starring himself, Glenn Close, Patti Lupone, Cynthia Erivo, Denis O'Hare, Nakhane, Laurie Anderson, Alan Mandell, Marion Cotillard, Ben Foster, and Madeline Brewer presented by the Luminary Podcast Network. He is a regular cast member on the podcast The Orbiting Human Circus (of the Air), which is published by Night Vale Presents. In 2019, John and Portland band Eyelids recorded Turning Time Around, an album of Lou Reed covers produced by REM's Peter Buck and released by Jealous Butcher Records as a benefit for Mitchell's mother's Alzheimer's care.

Mitchell's "distance-defying, community-built benefit album" New American Dream was released September 4, 2020 including collaborations with Ezra Furman, Alynda Segarra of Hurray for the Riff Raff, Stephen Trask, Jamie Stewart of Xiu Xiu, Wynton Marsalis, Jeremiah Lloyd Harmon, Catherine Russell and Leland benefitting a COVID food bank, a trans justice group and the Dr. MLK Scholarship Trust Fund.

In 2022, he played Joe Exotic in Peacock's streaming series adaptation of the Wondery podcast series Joe vs. Carole. John cowrote and sang a song from the point of view of the character, "Call Me Joe," featuring Nat Wolff as Joe's husband Travis Maldonado. That same year he appeared in the Netflix adaptation of The Sandman as Hal Carter, a B&B host and drag queen. He is a series cast member of Apple TV+'s upcoming City on Fire and is creating a new scripted podcast series Cancellation Island co-written with Michael Cavadias starring Holly Hunter, K. Todd Freeman, Mary Testa, Jo Firestone and Josh Pais. In 2022 and 2023 he toured a career retrospective concert with Amber Martin entitled Cassette Roulette.

Personal life
In 1985, at the age of 22, Mitchell came out as gay to his family and friends. He came out publicly in a 1992 New York Times profile. His subsequent writing has often explored sexuality and gender. He is a Radical Faerie. Mitchell's experiences with the group influenced the making of Shortbus. Along with Shortbus stars PJ DeBoy and Paul Dawson and performance artists Amber Martin and Angela Di Carlo, he is a co-founder and DJ of the long-running New York City monthly party "Mattachine," named after the early American gay rights organization Mattachine Society. In 2022, he came out as non-binary  and continues to use he/him pronouns.

Mitchell currently lives in Manhattan.

Filmed/Recorded Work

As director

As actor

See also
 Dramatic license
 LGBT culture in New York City
 List of LGBT people from New York City

References

External links

 
 
Mitchell Live at Amoeba Music "Origin of Love"
Mitchell's video for Bright Eyes' "First Day of My Life"
BBC Collective  Shortbus feature including John Cameron Mitchell video interview
John Cameron Mitchell interview at Eros-Zine.com (March 2007)

1963 births
Living people
Special Tony Award recipients
American film actors
American stage actors
American television actors
English-language film directors
American gay actors
LGBT film directors
American LGBT screenwriters
LGBT people from Texas
American people of Scottish descent
Radical Faeries members
American gay writers
Actors from El Paso, Texas
Sundance Film Festival award winners
Lambda Literary Award for Drama winners
Northwestern University School of Communication alumni
Non-binary directors
American non-binary actors
American non-binary writers